Sandra Prater (born February 6, 1955) is an American former Justice of the Peace and state legislator. She served in the Arkansas House of Representatives from 2003 to 2008. She was living in Jacksonville, Arkansas. She is the owner of Prater Auto Sales.

References

Living people
Members of the Arkansas House of Representatives
People from Jacksonville, Arkansas
1955 births